

Werner Freiherr von und zu Gilsa (4 March 1889 – 8 May 1945) was a German general in the Wehrmacht during World War II, whose last assignment was as military commandant of Dresden.

In 1936 he was the commander of the olympic village for the 1936 Summer Olympics. From 1 April 1941 to 4 April 1943, Gilsa was commander of the 216th Infantry Division. In the winter of 1941/42 the division was sent to the Eastern Front. Gilsa was promoted to General of Infantry on 1 July 1943. From 11 June 1943 to 23 November 1944 he was Commanding General of the LXXXIX Army Corps, which took part in the Battle of the Scheldt, from 2 October to 8 November 1944. Gilsa was Military Commander of Dresden from 15 March to May 1945.  At the end of the war, Gilsa committed suicide.

Awards and decorations
 Iron Cross (1914) 1st Class (18 October 1914) & 1st Class (14 May 1915)

 Clasp to the Iron Cross (1939) 2nd Class (14 September 1939) & 1st Class (21 October 1939)

 Knight's Cross of the Iron Cross with Oak Leaves
 Knight's Cross on 5 June 1940 as Oberst and commander of Infanterie-Regiment 9
 68th Oak Leaves on 24 January 1942 as Generalmajor and commander of 216. Infanterie-Division

References

Citations

Bibliography

 Dost, Susanne. Das Olympische Dorf 1936 im Wandel der Zeit, Neddermeyer, Berlin 2003, 
 
 
 
 

1889 births
1945 deaths
Military personnel from Berlin
German Army generals of World War II
Generals of Infantry (Wehrmacht)
Recipients of the Knight's Cross of the Iron Cross with Oak Leaves
History of the Olympic Village
Suicides in Germany
German Army personnel of World War I
Barons of Germany
German military personnel who committed suicide
Prussian Army personnel
People from the Province of Brandenburg
Recipients of the clasp to the Iron Cross, 1st class
Reichswehr personnel